Gandomriz or Gandom Riz or Gandum Riz may refer to:
 Gandomriz, Bushehr
 Gandomriz, Lali, Khuzestan Province
 Gandomriz, Masjed Soleyman, Khuzestan Province